Peter McCoppin (born May 2, 1948, in Toronto) is a Canadian conductor and organist.

He studied conducting with Erich Leinsdorf, Lovro von Matičič, and Hans Swarowsky, and taught conducting at the Cleveland Institute of Music (1975-1978).

He was assistant conductor of the Edmonton Symphony Orchestra (1978-1980), and conducted the Canadian Opera Company on tour in 1979.  He was music advisor of the Vancouver Symphony Orchestra as it recovered from bankruptcy (1988), music director of the Victoria Symphony (1989-1999), and music director of the Charlotte Symphony Orchestra (1993-2000).

He was principal guest conductor of the Thunder Bay Symphony Orchestra and the Syracuse Symphony Orchestra.

McCoppin has had virtually no conducting engagements with OCSM orchestras in almost a decade. John Becker's repeated description of McCoppin as "Mr. Music" in his book "Discord: The Story of the Vancouver Symphony", makes it clear he views McCoppin's populist approach as superficial, self-serving and shallow.

As a music director and despite Becker's view, McCoppin has consistently improved attendance and restored community support and financial stability, never having taken an orchestra through a "red-ink" season. As a guest conductor, McCoppin has led orchestras in Shanghai, Beijing, Tokyo, Osaka, Seoul, Sydney, Brisbane, Hobart, and Mexico City, as well as all of the major orchestras in Canada.  He has produced and conducted a recording of operetta arias with the American soprano, Sherri Seiden and the Slovak National Symphony Orchestra.

References

External links 
 Peter McCoppin entry in the Encyclopedia of Music in Canada
Official website

Male conductors (music)
Canadian classical organists
Male classical organists
Cleveland Institute of Music faculty
1948 births
Living people
21st-century Canadian conductors (music)
21st-century organists
21st-century Canadian male musicians